Elshitsa is a village in the Panagyurishte municipality, western Bulgaria, with 574 inhabitants as of 2018.

The region has seen substantial mining, including the Elshitsa epithermal deposit, a large open-pit copper mine active between 1928 and 1999.

References

Villages in Pazardzhik Province